The Bank of Guatemala is the central bank of Guatemala. It was established in 1945.

It is one of the most recognized Brutalist themed architectural structures. Designed by architects José Montes Córdova and Raúl Minondo, the iconic bank stands within the heart of the city's civic center. In collaboration with Guatemalan artists Dagoberto Vásquez Castañeda and Roberto González Goyri, the design highlights its Mayan heritage through the decorative East and West facing façades. Standing at 40 meters high, the concrete structure, in its materiality, reflects the Brutalist movement and its emphasis on a utilitarian design approach, but also slightly combats the movement due to the unique details of its façade. The beautiful design expresses an ornate subtlety which pays homage to the artistic importance Guatemalan culture has had on its urban landscape.

Governance
Sergio Francisco Recinos Rivera has been President of the bank since October 2018.

Functions
The Bank of Guatemala, determined by its Organic Law, has the following functions:

1: Be the sole issuer of the national currency;

2: Ensure that an adequate level of liquidity in the banking system is maintained, through the use of the instruments provided for in its Organic Law;

3: Ensure the proper functioning of the payment system;

4: Receive in deposit the bank reserves and legal deposits referred to in its Organic Law;

5: Manage international monetary reserves, in accordance with the guidelines issued by the Monetary Board; and

6: The other functions compatible with its nature as a Central Bank that are assigned to it by legal mandate.

Former Presidents of the Bank of Guatemala 

 Manuel Noriega Morales (1946–1954)
 Manuel Béndfeldt Jáuregui (1954)
 Gabriel Orellana Estrada (1954–1958)
 Gustavo Mirón Porras (1958–1960)
 Arturo Pérez Galliano (1960–1966)
 Francisco Fernández Rivas (1966–1970)
 Augusto Contreras Godoy (1970–1974)
 Manuel Méndez Escobar (1974–1978)
 Plinio Alfredo Grazioso Barrilas (1978–1982)
 Jorge González del Valle (1982)
 Armando González Campo (1983)
 Carlos Humberto Alpíre Pérez (1983–1984)
 Oscar Alvarez Marroquín (1984–1985)
 Jorge Luis Monzón Juárez (1985–1986)
 José Federico Linares Martínez (1986–1987)
 José Miguel Gaitán Ramírez (1987–1989)
 Lizardo Arturo Sosa López (1989–1990)
 Oscar Humberto Pineda Robles (1990–1991)
 José Federico Linares Martínez (1991–1993)
 Lizardo Arturo Sosa López (1993)
 Willy Waldemar Zapata Sagastume (1993–1997)
 Edin Homero Velázquez Escobedo (1997–2000)
 Lizardo Arturo Sosa Ramirez (2000–2006)
 María Antonieta Del Cid Navas de Bonilla (2006–2010)
 Edgar Baltazar Barquín Dúran (2010–2014)
 Julio Roberto Suárez Guerra (2014–2018)
 Sergio Francisco Recinos Rivera (2018-)

Source: Bank of Guatemala

See also
 Ministry of Public Finance
 Economy of Guatemala
 Guatemalan quetzal

References

External links
   Official site of Banco de Guatemala
   Official site of Banco de Guatemala
 

Guatemala
Economy of Guatemala
Banks established in 1945
1945 establishments in Guatemala